Nuha Marong Krubally (born 16 June 1993) is a Spanish-born Gambian professional footballer who plays as a forward for Malaysia Super League club Kelantan and the Gambia national team.

Club career
Born in Santa Coloma de Farners, Girona, Catalonia to Gambian parents, Nuha represented CE Farners, CD Blanes, Penya Barcelonista de Lloret and CF Lloret as a youth. He made his senior debut with the latter during the 2011–12 season, in the regional leagues.

On 26 June 2013, Nuha joined Segunda División B side UE Llagostera. He was sparingly used during the campaign, but notably scored the winner in a 3–1 home defeat of Gimnàstic de Tarragona in the play-offs, which ensured his team's first-ever promotion to Segunda División.

Nuha subsequently served loan stints at Tercera División sides UE Sant Andreu and Elche CF Ilicitano, scoring a career-best 21 goals for the latter. On 13 July 2016 he moved to another reserve team, CA Osasuna B in the third division.

On 24 June 2017, Nuha signed for Atlético Saguntino still in the third division. The following 17 May, he joined CD Castellón for the fourth tier play-offs, and subsequently agreed to a deal with CD Atlético Baleares on 6 July.

On 9 July 2019, Nuha agreed to a four-year deal with Racing de Santander, newly promoted to Segunda División. On 9 January 2020 he was signed by Granada CF, which first sent him to the reserve team, Club Recreativo Granada.

In 2022, Nuha signed with Bangladeshi outfit Bashundhara Kings. On 18 May, he helped the team winning their 2022 AFC Cup group stage opener with 1–0 margin against Maldivian side Maziya S&RC at the Salt Lake Stadium.

On 29 August 2022, Marong moved to India, signing with I-League side Rajasthan United on a season-long deal. He was part of the team's Baji Rout Cup win in Odisha. In January 2023, Morang parted ways with the club.

International career
Nuha has been called up for the Gambia national team on 6 February 2019. He made his debut for the latter on 22 March, in an Africa Cup of Nations qualifier against Algeria.

Career statistics

Club

Honours
Rajasthan United
Baji Rout Cup: 2022

References

External links
 
 
 
 

1993 births
Living people
Spanish people of Gambian descent
Spanish sportspeople of African descent
People with acquired Gambian citizenship
People from Santa Coloma de Farners
Sportspeople from the Province of Girona
Spanish footballers
Footballers from Catalonia
Gambian footballers
Association football forwards
Segunda División B players
Tercera División players
Divisiones Regionales de Fútbol players
UE Costa Brava players
UE Sant Andreu footballers
Elche CF Ilicitano footballers
CA Osasuna B players
Atlético Saguntino players
CD Castellón footballers
CD Atlético Baleares footballers
Racing de Santander players
Club Recreativo Granada players
The Gambia international footballers
Bashundhara Kings players
Rajasthan United FC players
Malaysia Super League players
Kelantan F.C. players